McClellanville Historic District is a national historic district located at McClellanville, Charleston County, South Carolina. The district encompasses 105 contributing buildings in the town of McClellanville.  They include residential, commercial, religious and educational building dating between about 1860 to 1935. Architectural styles include: Carpenter Gothic, Queen Anne, and Italianate.  Notable buildings include the King Brothers Store, McClellanville Public School, New Wappetaw Presbyterian Church (c. 1877), Bank of McClellanville (c. 1919), McClellanville Methodist Episcopal Church (c. 1902), and a number of dwellings originally built as summer homes by St. James Santee and Georgetown planters.

It was listed on the National Register of Historic Places in 1982.

References

Historic districts on the National Register of Historic Places in South Carolina
Gothic Revival architecture in South Carolina
Italianate architecture in South Carolina
Queen Anne architecture in South Carolina
Buildings and structures in Charleston County, South Carolina
National Register of Historic Places in Charleston County, South Carolina